"Sworn and Broken" is a song by the American alternative-rock group Screaming Trees. It is the second single released in support of their seventh album, Dust.

Formats and track listing 
UK 7" single (663870 7)
"Sworn and Broken" (Gary Lee Conner, Van Conner, Mark Lanegan) – 3:35
"Butterfly" (live) (Gary Lee Conner, Van Conner, Mark Lanegan) – 3:10

UK CD single (663870 2)
"Sworn and Broken" (Gary Lee Conner, Van Conner, Mark Lanegan) – 3:35
"Butterfly" (live) (Gary Lee Conner, Van Conner, Mark Lanegan) – 3:10
"Dollar Bill" (live) (Van Conner, Mark Lanegan) – 4:17
"Caught Between/The Secret Kind" (live) (Gary Lee Conner, Van Conner, Mark Lanegan, Barrett Martin) – 7:38

Charts

Personnel
Adapted from the Sworn and Broken liner notes.

Screaming Trees
 Gary Lee Conner – acoustic guitar, electric guitar, backing vocals
 Van Conner – bass guitar, backing vocals
 Mark Lanegan – lead vocals
 Barrett Martin – drums, percussion

Production and additional personnel
 George Drakoulias – production
 Dean Karr – photography
 Andy Wallace – mixing
 Howie Weinberg – mastering

Release history

References

External links 
 

1996 songs
1996 singles
Screaming Trees songs
Songs written by Gary Lee Conner
Songs written by Van Conner
Songs written by Mark Lanegan
Epic Records singles